In ten-dimensional geometry, a rectified 10-simplex is a convex uniform 10-polytope, being a rectification of the regular 10-simplex.

These polytopes are part of a family of 527 uniform 10-polytopes with A10 symmetry.

There are unique 5 degrees of rectifications including the zeroth, the 10-simplex itself. Vertices of the rectified 10-simplex are located at the edge-centers of the 10-simplex. Vertices of the birectified 10-simplex are located in the triangular face centers of the 10-simplex. Vertices of the trirectified 10-simplex are located in the tetrahedral cell centers of the 10-simplex. Vertices of the quadrirectified 10-simplex are located in the 5-cell centers of the 10-simplex.

Rectified 10-simplex 

The rectified 10-simplex is the vertex figure of the 11-demicube.

Alternate names
 Rectified hendecaxennon (Acronym ru) (Jonathan Bowers)

Coordinates 

The Cartesian coordinates of the vertices of the rectified 10-simplex can be most simply positioned in 11-space as permutations of (0,0,0,0,0,0,0,0,0,1,1). This construction is based on facets of the rectified 11-orthoplex.

Images

Birectified 10-simplex

Alternate names
 Birectified hendecaxennon (Acronym bru) (Jonathan Bowers)

Coordinates 
The Cartesian coordinates of the vertices of the birectified 10-simplex can be most simply positioned in 11-space as permutations of (0,0,0,0,0,0,0,0,1,1,1). This construction is based on facets of the birectified 11-orthoplex.

Images

Trirectified 10-simplex

Alternate names
 Trirectified hendecaxennon (Jonathan Bowers)

Coordinates 
The Cartesian coordinates of the vertices of the trirectified 10-simplex can be most simply positioned in 11-space as permutations of (0,0,0,0,0,0,0,1,1,1,1). This construction is based on facets of the trirectified 11-orthoplex.

Images

Quadrirectified 10-simplex

Alternate names
 Quadrirectified hendecaxennon (Acronym teru) (Jonathan Bowers)

Coordinates 
The Cartesian coordinates of the vertices of the quadrirectified 10-simplex can be most simply positioned in 11-space as permutations of (0,0,0,0,0,0,1,1,1,1,1). This construction is based on facets of the quadrirectified 11-orthoplex.

Images

Notes

References 
 H.S.M. Coxeter: 
 H.S.M. Coxeter, Regular Polytopes, 3rd Edition, Dover New York, 1973 
 Kaleidoscopes: Selected Writings of H.S.M. Coxeter, edited by F. Arthur Sherk, Peter McMullen, Anthony C. Thompson, Asia Ivic Weiss, Wiley-Interscience Publication, 1995,  
 (Paper 22) H.S.M. Coxeter, Regular and Semi Regular Polytopes I, [Math. Zeit. 46 (1940) 380-407, MR 2,10]
 (Paper 23) H.S.M. Coxeter, Regular and Semi-Regular Polytopes II, [Math. Zeit. 188 (1985) 559-591]
 (Paper 24) H.S.M. Coxeter, Regular and Semi-Regular Polytopes III, [Math. Zeit. 200 (1988) 3-45]
 Norman Johnson Uniform Polytopes, Manuscript (1991)
 N.W. Johnson: The Theory of Uniform Polytopes and Honeycombs, Ph.D. (1966)
  x3o3o3o3o3o3o3o3o3o - ux, o3x3o3o3o3o3o3o3o3o - ru, o3o3x3o3o3o3o3o3o3o - bru, o3o3o3x3o3o3o3o3o3o - tru, o3o3o3o3x3o3o3o3o3o - teru

External links 
 Polytopes of Various Dimensions
 Multi-dimensional Glossary

10-polytopes